Ahmed Ayad (Arabic:  أحمد عياد) better known by his stage name as Rouiched; was an Algerian comedy actor and singer, born on April 28, 1921, at Algiers and died on January 28, 1999, at El Biar (Algiers).

Biography 
Rouiched was from Kabylie (Town of Azeffoun, Aarch Ait Djennad, Wilaya of Tizi-Ouzou). During his childhood, he had many occupations to survive. Self-educated, his took the stage for the first time in a theater piece of Abdelhamid Ababsa called “Estardjâ Ya Assi”. His interpretation was remarkable. After that, he devoted himself and his time to the art, and became the leader of an artistic troop. He worked with a lot of great actors of that times: Rachid Ksentini, Mustapha Badie, Nadjat Tounsi, Sid-Ali Fernandel, Mohamed Touri, Mustapha Kateb…

After the independence of Algeria in 1962, he was a member of “Théatre National Algerien” (Algerian National Theater). But his greatest success was the film “Hassen Terro” of Mohamed Lakhdar-Hamina. He pursued his career on the Algerian Television and acted in many comedies and telefilms until his death.

Filmography 
 1967 : Hassan terro
 1971 : L'Opium et le Bâton
 1974 : L'évasion de Hassan Terro de Mustapha Badie.
 1982 : Hassan Taxi
 1983 : L'Affiche de Djamel Fezzaz, 
 1989 : Hassan Niya
 1991 : Ombres blanches

Bibliography 
Dictionnaire des musiciens et interprètes algériens, Achour Cheurfi, ANEP Ed. Alger 1997

External links 
 

Algerian male stage actors
20th-century Algerian male actors
Kabyle people
1921 births
1999 deaths
Algerian male television actors